West Mancos River is a  tributary of the Mancos River in Montezuma County, Colorado. The river flows from the confluence of its North and South forks in the San Juan National Forest to a confluence with the East Mancos River that forms the Mancos River.

See also
List of rivers of Colorado
List of tributaries of the Colorado River

References

Rivers of Colorado
Rivers of Montezuma County, Colorado
Tributaries of the Colorado River in Colorado